James Rutherford may refer to:

James Rutherford (Australian pioneer) (1827–1911), transit pioneer in Australia
James Todd Rutherford (born 1970), American politician; state representative for South Carolina 
James Rutherford (New Zealand politician) (1825–1883), New Zealand politician 
James W. Rutherford (1925–2010), American politician; mayor of Flint, Michigan
James Rutherford (baritone) (born 1972), British bass baritone
James Rutherford (historian) (1906–1963), New Zealand historian at the University of Auckland
Jim Rutherford (born 1949), Canadian ice hockey goalkeeper
Jim Rutherford (baseball) (1886–1956), Major League Baseball center fielder
Jim Rutherford (footballer) (1894–1924), English football full back
Jim Rutherford (rugby league) (1913–1964), Australian rugby league player
James Rankin Rutherford (1882–1967), Scottish politician
James Rutherford (Canadian politician) (1875–1939), member of the Canadian House of Commons
Skip Rutherford (James Luin Rutherford III, born 1950), American non-profit executive and academic administrator
J. T. Rutherford (1921–2006), American politician from Texas
James Rutherford (MP) (died 1747), Scottish politician

See also
F. James Rutherford (1924–2021), American scientist